Laree A. Slack (July 4, 1989November 11, 2001) was the victim of child abuse that led to her death. She was whipped with "an inch-thick section of rubberized electrical cable filled with strands of wire" repeatedly  and died from internal bleeding several hours later.

Trial

Her father, Larry Slack Sr., was convicted of first-degree murder in 2006 as a result of the beating. He received a life sentence for the murder and a 30-year sentence for aggravated battery of a child. The mother, Constance Slack, received a 25-year sentence after pleading guilty to murder. The beatings of Laree and her eight-year-old brother started because of a claimed failure to properly clear away laundry, leading to difficulty finding a credit card. The father's interpretation of Biblical injunctions regarding the punishment of children were a factor in the severity of the beating. The parents were devout Jehovah's Witnesses who home-schooled their six children. Investigators said the parents decided to administer Biblical discipline in the form of "40 lashes minus one, three times".

The crime was used as an illustration in the 2005 edition of the textbook Delinquency in society that an "intact two parent family" with strong religious values is not so important as having a "loving family" in preventing violence toward children.

References 

1989 births
2001 deaths
Whipping
Corporal punishments
Child abuse resulting in death
Religiously motivated violence in the United States
2001 in Illinois
Murdered American children
People murdered in Illinois
American torture victims
Slack, Laree
Deaths by beating in the United States
2001 murders in the United States
Incidents of violence against girls